Muhammad Iqbal (1877 – 1938) is the national poet of Pakistan and is regarded as the soul behind creation of Pakistan. He is equally famous and well known in India and beyond for his philosophical, poetic and political works and services that he rendered for Pakistan, India, Afghanistan, Iran, and the Muslim world at large. The political objective condition of Indian subcontinent in pre-partition time influenced his poetry and politics in marked way. These political conditions ranged from British and Indian rivalry to the Muslim/Non Muslim or Muslim League and Congress rivalry. Iqbal in his poetry and practices has eloquently given expression to these conditions. Not only expressed it, but he also delivered speeches, addresses, and wrote about the amicable solutions of all these problems in the best interest of all. The political philosophy of Muhammad Iqbal went through several phases of development. The first (until 1905) was pan-Indian nationalism with a belief in the nationhood based on language, culture, race, and geography. The second (1905–08) was transitional/mental conflict and the third (1908–26) was Pan-Islamism/Muslim nationalism advocating political unity of the Muslim world. The fourth (1926–38) was Supranationalism or Internationalism wherein the Muslim ummah was universal, the boundaries of the state were for administrative convenience only and the affinity was spiritual.

In Iqbal's political philosophy and practice, parliamentary spiritual democratic system is universalistic and particularistic in its range. Global in nature, it is anchored in the religion of Islam that gives it a universal look. In 1926, when he entered politics to realize this ideal in practice, his ideas started to reflect the political scenario of the subcontinent. Besides Islam, Iqbal had made use of a good deal of western political concepts of nationalism, democracy, secularism, sovereignty, ethics of politics and communism. But he neither fully appreciates nor discards out rightly all these concepts. On the other hand, he has expounded his own political ideals of Tawhid, Khudi, Mumin, Islamic democracy, Millat, etc. Through these patterns of thought, Iqbal try to train an individual, a society and a global Islamic order. This universal order as it is construed from the concept of ummah will strive for the promotion of Panhumanism, i.e., freedom, brotherhood, and equality of humanity.

Overview 
Iqbal's poetry and prose, despite their philosophical content and tone, are overtly political. This can be attributed to the political environment of British India in the late nineteenth and in the first half of the twentieth century; any intellectual of that period, whether Hindu or Muslim, could not help but join the struggle for freedom in their respective capacities. He has written many poems reflecting his first state of mind and philosophy i.e., pan-Indian nationalism. For instance, National Song for Hindustani Children takes pride in the beautiful features of the country like the great prophetic traditions, fertile soil, and heritage. Similarly, the Tarana-i-Hindi describes Hindustan as a lovely and lovable country; "Thou seest deity in the images of stone / For me there is deity in every particle of the country’s dust". According to Riffat Hassan a writer and political analyst: "Two things which stand foremost in Iqbal’s pre 1905 political poetry is: his desire to see a self-governing and united India free of both alien domination and inner dissension. This thinking of line portrayed the given political situation of India wherein British asserted its state authority against Indian and Indian asserted their identity-based politics against each other. This position denies of him as being ‘fanatics’, according to Dino and Ahmed (2018). Secondly his constant endeavor to draw attention to those factors of decadence which caused the decline of Muslims in India".

Iqbal visited Europe in pursuit of higher education and stayed there for three years, 1905–08. There he underwent a radical change. He became ambivalent towards pan-Indian nationalism and became pan-Islamist therein. He believed that self-centered competition between man and man and between nation and nation disintegrates human society. When he came back from Europe, he had already given up pan-Indian nationalism and adopted the cult of Pan-Islamism: from now onward started believing in one Muslim Ummah. He was no more believing in race and nationality and asked for unity among the Muslims. As he writes, "Break, break the idols of color and race / In the Millat yourself you must efface / Call not yourself of Turkish nationality, or an Irani, or an Afghani". Iqbal had now donned the mettle of pan-Islamism by advocating the role of religion in politics. He now believed that “politics has its roots in the spiritual life of man… [and] religion is a force of great importance in the life of individual as well as nations”. The membership of Islam is not determined by birth, locality, or naturalization. The expression ‘Indian Mouhammedan,’ however convenient it may be, is a contradiction in terms. Since, Islam is the religion which is considered above time and space condition. Muslim's nationality has no geographical basis. The Muslims looks for it in the holy town of Mecca. In the beginning Iqbal interest in practical politics remained very low rather he remained critic of Congress and Muslim League policies. However, against to his previous conviction, he entered the realm of politics in 1926 where he tried to combine “his Islamic universalism and territorial nationalism…”. “It seems to me that God is slowly bringing home to us the truth that Islam is neither nationalism nor imperialism but a League of Nations which recognizes artificial boundaries and racial distinctions for facility of reference only, and not for restricting the social horizon of its members”.

Western Ideas of Politics
After coming from Europe, where he closely observed and interacted with the Western life, Iqbal disapproved of the Western civilization. He discarded nationalism because of its divisive influence in society especially of Muslims. Zafar Ishaq Ansari writes that Iqbal observed that how “nationalism had destroyed the idea of universal brotherhood; how it had created barriers between man and man and between nation and nation; how it had sown seeds of international discords. Furthermore, he also became conscious of the dangerous possibilities of the idea of nationalism in the context of the Muslim world”. Again, the same author writes that “Iqbal’s condemnation of nationalism is not a condemnation of love of the fatherland. It is a condemnation of the modern concept of nation and fatherland, the significance of which is not merely geographical. ‘It is rather principle of human society’ which claim to be the only proper basis of cohesion and unity in human society and which exiles religion from playing a befitting role in human society”. It is this (nationalism) which divides the creatures of God into nations, It is this which strikes the roots of the nationality of Islam. For Iqbal religion was a unifying and central factor to politics and society of ummah. As he says, “Our heart is not of India, Turkey and Syria / Our commonplace is nothing but place”. Iqbal does not believe in the secularism of European political thought. He considers that separation of church and state occurred due to material advancement and nationalism demands from the people to switch over their loyalties from religion to nation-state. Khursheed Kamal Aziz writes that “one of the things on which Iqbal takes an uncompromising stand is the unique character of Islam as a combination of the spiritual and the worldly. It is as much an ethical system as a polity. It is not a religion in the ordinary sense of the word; it is a way of life”. Islam does not bifurcate the unity of man into an irreconcilable duality of sprit and matter. In Islam God and universe, sprit and matter, church, and state, are organic to each other. Man is not the citizen of a profane world to be renounced in the interest of a world of sprit situated elsewhere. To Islam matter is sprit realizing itself in space and time’. This is said to emphasize the fact that there is no place in Islam for a separation of religion and state, of things spiritual and secular. Iqbal also discusses positive and negative aspects of communism. Iqbal's condemnation of concentration of wealth in few hands, exploitation of workers by capitalist class, his welfare feeling for the Punjab's peasants and the landlords’ unjust treatment of peasants, are having socialistic appeal to the people. He writes few poems in this connection like: ‘Punjab Kai Dehqan Sey’ (To the Punjab Peasant) and ‘Lenin Khudda Kai Hazur Main’ (Lenin in the Presence of God) are socialistic in nature. Parveen Feroz Hassan writes that “Iqbal points out that though Marx is not a prophet, he has a book to his credit”. Iqbal appreciates communism for its stand on the equality, principle, labor rights and exploitative economic order of capitalism, but, in the words of Parveen Feroz, it is the ‘Godlessness’ of the communist doctrine which infuriated Iqbal. “In Javid Nama he advises the Communists to change their attitude of negation of God to positive recognition of the Almighty”. He praises Zakat institution of Islam and the equality of Islam. Iqbal was opposed to capitalism and communism for different reasons. How Iqbal views western democracy? Waheed Ishrat has deducted Iqbal's criticism of democracy from his poetry as following:
The Western democratic system is the same old European Caesarism or imperialism.
The Western democracies only protect the interest of capitalists.
He was against the philosophy of one's man one's vote. He believed that majority of the common people cannot be equal to wise man. He was in favor of wise man decision.
The democratic institutions such as election, membership, council, and president ship etc. are the rotten eggs of the new civilization.

Own Innovative Ideas

His assumptions of Tawhid (Oneness of God and the prophet hood of Muhammad), Khudi (ego), Mumin (The Perfect Man), Millat (The Community, individual and community relationship), and Ijtihad (parliament spiritual democracy) are pivotal to his political philosophy. Tauhid is fundamental to all aspects of life. Writing about the importance of tauhid in politics Iqbal says “that the new culture finds the foundation of world-unity in the principle of tauhid. Islam, as a polity, is only a practical means of making this principle a living factor in the intellectual and emotional life of mankind. It demands loyalty to God, not to thrones. And since God is the ultimate spiritual basis of a life, loyalty to God virtually amounts to man’s loyalty to his own ideal nature”. His books The Secrets of the Self and others explain the concept of khudi. Iqbal does not use this term in the meaning of arrogance but rather ego is proportional strength of object. Firmness and determination are its activating virtues that lead man towards change, creativity and triumph as famously said for Iqbal by one author “I act, therefore I am”. His concept of Khudi is based on Quranic verse, “Verily God will not change the conditions of man till they change what is in themselves”. The individual himself takes the initiative in the development of khudi. In Iqbal's words an individual becomes a ‘dead matter’ if he ceases to know the importance of sprit within him. Ideas alone are not sufficient there must be action, movement, restlessness, love, and courageous sense of the importance of the self. Iqbal writes in the preface of his book which book that “the Quran is the book which emphasizes ‘deed’ rather than ‘idea’”, Khudi is continuous struggle in life for the higher mission. Certain qualities are essential for the growth and consolidation of khudi like: ishq (love) faqr (indifference to material possessions), courage and creativity. These qualities make khudi a powerful force. Similarly, some factors also weaken it like fear, beggary, and slavery. As he says, “The light of the self, and the fire of the self / Constitute the very essence of Islam, the fire of the Self nourishes life with enlightenment and consciousness / This is the nature of every object, and this is the cause of growth, however, the Nature has concealed its essence”. The concept of momin in Iqbal is also based on the Quran, which is a major inspirational source for his views. His momin is not only an embodiment of all the Quranic principles but is in fact, the Quran in action. The momin has great qualities of power, vision, action, and wisdom. These qualities in their perfect form are most noticeable in the character of Holy prophet. By these qualities when brought into action momin reaches to the stage of perfection and master of universe. Iqbal says that a momin is the replica of Divine qualities. Iqbal's momin is a moral creature, who is endowed with spiritual and religious prowess, and acting within the boundaries of the Canon Law is a mastercreator himself. His ceaseless struggle is directed towards the conquest of the universe and its culmination reaches when God and universe are absorbed in his being. The whole concept is, however, idealistic in nature. When such human emerges, is not clearly given in his thought but the momin will evolve from the inherent potentials and his spiritual and intellectual endeavors. As he says, “Transmute thy handful of dust into gold / Kiss the threshold of the Perfect man”.

Islam, Individual, Community and State
This community is bound by the belief of tauhid, and not by the factors of geography and ethnic bonds. He elaborates the same theme in the verses which say that our Master (the Holy Prophet), by leaving his native land resolved the problems of Muslim nationhood. Iqbal's millat is a universal community of Believers, transcending all barriers of caste, color, race, nationality, and territory. This concept of his is linked with the pan-Islamic movement that was going on in subcontinent and other Muslim countries at that time. He advocates like an individual the community must live a life of constant struggle and ceaseless endeavour. He further says that community has also its khudi which has all the attributes of the individual ego. Vigour, force, power, determination, will rise and move forward, and courage to fight, are the characteristics of the collective khudi of the community. He asks the Muslim world to consolidate the khudi as it was done by the Turks and Egyptian for their development, because without it state and religion cannot exist. After discussing these concepts separately, Iqbal then establishes a relationship between the individual and community. He says that the community is a great blessing for the individual who provides ample opportunities to the development of his heart and head. Similarly, community gets organization and strength from the individual. He connects khudi (self), self here means an individual, and bekhudi (selflessness), here means community. If self-inculcates uniqueness, initiative, determination and ambition, selflessness creates a spirit of sacrifice, devotion, and merger of the individual wills into the bigger will of the community for the greater good of all the members of community. The individual exists as a part of society. Alone he is nothing A wave is a wave only inside the river Outside of it, it is nothing. Now, how Iqbal conceives democracy in Islam and Muslim world? Iqbal criticism of western democracy was mainly due to the peculiar circumstances that Muslim were facing either in the Subcontinent or elsewhere, but he was not outright rejecter of this value. His political thought is akin to democratic government in the individual Islamic state or democracy-based Islamic an international order. He terms his democracy as a “spiritual democracy”, different in many respects from Western democracy. “Let the Muslim of today appreciate his position, reconstruct his social life in the light of ultimate principles, and evolve, out of hitherto partially revealed purpose of Islam, that spiritual democracy which is the ultimate aim of Islam”. Parveen Feroz writes that “Iqbal condemns the Western democracy and advocates in its place the spiritual democracy. In fact, the spiritual democracy is the only form of government that suits the ideological state of Iqbal”. Thus, Iqbal's belief is that Islamic political system which is democratic in nature, and rests on spiritualism’. The same author has noted down the following political principles that Iqbal considered that have a democratic essence.
 Election was the only way to express the will of the people, and partial expression of people's will be considered null and void.
 De facto political sovereignty resided with the people.
 The caliph was not necessarily the high priest of Islam. He was not representative of God on earth. He was fallible like every other Muslim and subjects to the same impersonal authority of Divine Law.
 Although the Caliph was the head of the State, he could be directly sued in an ordinary law court.
 The Caliph could indicate his successor, but the nomination was not valid without the confirmation by the people.
 The elector had the right to demand the deposition of the Caliph, or the dismissal of his officials if their behavior was in contravention to the laws of the sharia.

About the ijtihad and parliament Iqbal writes in his book The Reconstruction of Religious Thought in Islam, that the growth of republican spirit and the gradual formation of legislative assemblies in Muslim lands constitute a great step forward. The transfer of power of ijtihad from individual representatives of schools to a Muslim legislative assembly, which in view of the growth of opposition sects, is the only form ijma can take in modern times, will secure contributions to legal discussions from laymen who happen to possess a keen insight into affairs. Waheed Ishrat says that Iqbal favoured ‘elected assembly’ and its mandate to have ‘power of ijtihad’ instead a single individual for interpretation of sharia. Even he liked that ‘elected body’ functions on the line of a true caliphate system, and the legislature can make a ‘collective decisions’ as legislated collectively. So, he favored such system, as Turkey made it operative at that time, where Muslims are in majority. Anyhow, Iqbal, as such, was least concerned with the name of the system of the government but most concerned with the ‘principles of spiritual’ of Islam to be its permanent features. As Iqbal grew older and Indian became assertive in their demand in political arena-his thought became solid and mature, and so he was dictated by the political condition of subcontinent to do something practically if he were to realize these ideals of politics in the larger interest of the Muslim ummah. He enters practical politics in 1926. He complemented his pan-Islamism with territorial nationalism in the subcontinent context. After elaborating the basic postulates of Islamic ideology and its relevance to individual, society, and mankind, turned his attention to the Indian Muslims who were simultaneously menaced by British Imperialism and danger of permanent Hindu domination. Caught in the vortex of Indian politics, therefore, the basic problem of the Indian Muslims was how to regenerate their individual and collective selves and preserve their Islamic identity. A satisfactory solution of the problem implied policies and actions at three different levels:
 Reconstruction of Muslim society in the Indian subcontinent according to the Islamic ideology.
 Facing the upsurge of Indian nationalism to preserve the Islamic identity of Indian Muslims.
 Integration of the Indian Muslims with the rest of the Islamic Millat.

Iqbal considered Muslim community as a separate nationality, and he wanted first, full autonomous status in the Muslim majority areas, and later an independent action of line from the Congress. His presidential address of 1930 is famous in this regard: I would like to see the Punjab, North-West Frontier Province, Sind, and Balochistan amalgamated into a single state. Self-government, within the British empire or without the British empire, the formation of a consolidated Indian Muslim state appears to me the final destiny of Muslim at least of North-West India. However, for Iqbal the establishment of a Muslim State in the Indian subcontinent was not an end by itself, but it was a means to achieve a higher goal-consolidation of the world-millat. Thus, the contradiction between Iqbal's theory of the Islami millat and his proposal for the establishment of a consolidated Muslim State in the North-West Indian region was, in fact more apparent than real... Hindu-Muslim conflict was a much deeper ideological cleavages between Islam and nationalism, and ‘therefore, the construction of a polity on national lines, if it means a displacement of the Islamic principle of a solidarity, is unthinkable to a Muslim”. “The Indian Muslims, by virtue of a common faith and history, are closely bound together with the rest of the Islamic millat living in the West Asia, and at the same time have their peculiarly Indian features. Therefore, in lending support to Two-nation theory, Iqbal was chiefly concerned with the consolidation of the Muslim community in the Northwest Indian region where they constituted majority. For this purpose, he used the theory of modern nationalism to counter the arguments of the All-Indian National Congress in defence of united Indian nationalism”. Iqbal believes ideally in a completely unified Muslim world.

State and Religion 
Muhammad Iqbal existed in the era connecting two periods: the former feudal culture and contemporary capitalism. Because of the place of his origin, his education, and his journey in Europe, he was able to weigh and measure the advantages and deficiencies of both eras. Indeed, he was primarily a poet by nature, who observed and reacted to the stillness of the Muslims and the inner calamity which confronted Islam. He had a high regard for the attainments of the West, its energetic spirit, academic custom, and scientific advancements. But at the same time he condemned the imperialism of European colonial rule, the ethical decline of secularism and the economic exploitation of capitalism. Thus, he supported the idea to revert to the basics of Islam so as to create an Islamic substitute for contemporary Muslim culture. His appeal to action and his cachet have been exploited by the Ulama and politicians. Therefore, rather than to criticize Iqbal's imperfect perception of clarity as a shortcoming, it ought to be considered as Ulama's and politicians insufficiencies, who in their impulsive anxiousness believed that they are following him, but this was not the case in reality. If Iqbal did not propose an absolute principled formation of Islam, he certainly inferred the fundamentals of religion on profound and sound basis for further development. So, that the edifice developed on them would be unlike conventional Islam, and thus Iqbal's inferred fundamentals could advance into a more efficient society. On the other hand, the Ulama did not realize that the decisive factor of authority has altered in the contemporary world: authority is at present calculated in scholarly and scientific stipulations, and this is the actual foundation on which Western civilization has developed and sustained its status of supremacy in the world. In fact, Muslims also had in the past accomplished their pre-eminence through education, and their enthusiasm for learning. However, they shifted their focus from learning to following, and thus their decline started. The Ulama inclined to consider this supremacy in complete political stipulations, lacking the perception, that it was indeed a result of the earlier scholars‘ thoughtful reformations. They persist exclusively on the political image of the world, so that the importance of new reformations is lessened. Instead of fulfilling the immense requirement of adaptation, the Ulama have maintained the approach of averting these reformations. They use Iqbal's poetry as a valid evidence for their arguments and tried to fascinate the sentiment of the people. In contrast, to his lectures, the Ulama are in complete agreement with his poetry. His ardent admiration of Islam, not simply as a religion, but as an all-inclusive political approach, in fact acted in reaching a persuasive sway on Muslim intellectual academics. The novels of Abdul Halim Sharar, the poems of Altaf Hussain Hali and Iqbal, and the writings of Muhammad Ali enthralled Indian Muslims and reinforced the consciousness of a distinct Muslim identity. This was essential on emotional basis rather than by rational arguments. Iqbal stressed on the complexity of forces for acquiring advancement, and he believed that every effort to struggle with this complexity is a sacred deed. He stated: An act is temporal or profane if it is done in a spirit of detachment from the infinite complexity of life behind it; it is spiritual if it is inspired by that complexity. Iqbal did not seem to support aloofness or impartiality, but a moral fiber of dedication and loyalty to the source of religion. Life is complex, and spiritualism exists in identifying this complexity. Hence he stated: ...in Islam it is the same reality which appears as the Church looked at from one point of view and the State from another. It is not true to say that Church and State are two sides or facets of the same thing. Islam is a single unanalyzable reality which is one or the other as your point of view varies. As we do not intend to delve into philosophical inquiry at present, it might be significant to state that Iqbal supported internal association among state and religion. The essence of Tauhid, as a working idea, is equality, solidarity, and freedom. The state from the Islamic standpoint is an endeavor to transform these ideal principles into space-time forces, an aspiration to realize them in a definite human organization. It is in this sense alone that the state in Islam is a theocracy, not in the sense that it is headed by a representative of God on earth who can always screen his despotic will behind his supposed infallibility. Thus he truly believed that the main concentration and desire of an Islamic formation of government is to uplift the morals of its society. For this reason Iqbal believed final truth as spiritual, and life as exists on Earth is terrestrial, in which the spirit traces its chances to build up in the existing natural conditions through substantial progress with the secular developments. Likewise the Quran states:

This is in complete contradiction of the superficial Islamic jurisprudential laws, which was indeed an idealistic approach, since no Islamic state practiced those isolated outline set of laws as prescribed by the orthodoxies for Islamic state. All Muslim states have their own distinct law formation legislative bodies. Like Turkey, for whom Iqbal felt great affection to, is significantly established as a secular state and does not primarily empower religion and thus became one of the few Muslim countries who have progressed. Iqbal attributed the deteriorating force of Islam to the Muslim societies moving away from Islamic virtues. His political theory, similar to his philosophy in other aspects, was distinguished by a deliberate return to history to revive those ideas and morals which could present a paradigm for the present as well as the future. His poetry reflected his disappointment for Muslims denial of the facts. Although we have both examples of modesty and authority in the life of the Prophet, the Ulama, who were influenced by Iqbal's poetry, highlighted his period of authority and regarded his modest period as mere struggling time. Thus the Islamic ideology took a far-reaching transformation through Iqbal's poetry. Before him, Syed Ahmad Khan strongly believed that Muslims should concentrate solely on their education so that they could be socially upgraded. He believed that the ability to rule came subsequently when the nation becomes mature, educated and open minded. Moreover, political authority is completely a worldly accomplishment that could be regard as worldly benefit, and the complete focus on it will result in lessening the worth of religious values. However, Sayed's reaction on Urdu-Hindi conflicts influenced Iqbal, and he based all his political thought on the differences between Hindus and Muslims.....Sir Sayyed Ahmad Khan (d.1898) who, after the Hindi-Urdu conflict, reached the conclusion that these two nations could not live together. He was followed by Iqbal (d.1938) and finally Jinnah(d.1948), who reiterated the concept of the two-nation theory and emphasized the separateness of the two communities. Although he was in agreement with Sir Sayyed in the concept of a two-nation theory, in this next quote, Iqbal is against him and believed that there is no essential division between religion and politics in Islam. He regarded the split among religion and politics as an aversion from the spirit of Islam. The religious and philosophical thoughts of people were mainly the demonstration of their political situations. He also believed that the execution of sound political formation was fundamental for the moral and spiritual growth of people in a Muslim society....politics requires religion to survive and to play an active role in the Muslim society. In the words of poet Iqbal if religion is separated from politics, it becomes tyranny. Thus, when Iqbal supported a cooperative mutually beneficial connection between religion and politics, he actually contemplated legitimatizing the appreciated principles of human unity, egalitarianism and liberty. His idea of the distinct objective for Muslims in history, and his considered opinion of the essential impact of the competent regime in the character building of society, became the source for his upcoming persistence on the requirement of a divided territory for the Muslims of the Indian Subcontinent. Ideologically, Iqbal was against secular form of government. In this regard, he seemed to support the orthodox to some extent, however, he did not support the view of caliphate as the traditionalist claim, but he had a soft heart for the Ulama, since essentially he was afraid of fragmentation among Indian Muslims. He said: In India circumstances are much more peculiar. This country of religious communities where the future of each community rests entirely upon its solidarity is ruled by a Western people who cannot but adopt a policy of non-interference in religion. This liberal and indispensable policy in a country like India has led to most unfortunate results.... Any religious adventurer in India can set up any claim and carve out a new community for his own exploitation. This liberal State of ours does not care a fig for the integrity of a parent community, provided the adventurer assures it of his loyalty and his followers are regular in the payment of taxes due to the State. Iqbal's most important contribution was his restoration of a conscious energetic spirit of Islam. He was symbolic to Muslims whose Islamic principles that needed a fresh spirit to their Islamic society. He rebuilt the basic ideals in his poetry that could rouse Muslims, educated and uneducated, to an intuition of what ideal they ought to have, and blaze their intellects with a longing to discover means of seizing such ideals. Iqbal, like most men, was limited by his temperament. A poet draws heavily upon his feelings and emotions as he attempts to convey his intuition of reality.... However, neither poetic temperament nor the poem itself is concerned with the practical implementation of social reforms or the realization of the ideal.....He expressed the need of the Muslim community when he called for the formation of Pakistan but its practical implementation was to fall to Jinnah and others. Still there is a place in our world for the idealists. To have clothed his insights in poetic form and thus to have fired the hearts and minds of millions to pursue and implement these ideals is an extraordinary achievement, one which more than justifies the great esteem that Muhammad Iqbal had enjoyed. Iqbal had an insight of a perfect society, which is a significant inspiration. However, he did not completely resolve this perfect society as an idealistic world-Utopia. He perceived to be Muslim in the meaning of personifying the ideals and principles of religion or the experiential Muslim society like the Government of India's opinion poll identifies it. ....To my mind, government, whatever its form, is one of the determining forces of a people's character. Loss of political power is equally ruinous to nations‘ character. Ever since their political fall the Musalmans of India have undergone a rapid ethical deterioration.

Democratic system 
The twentieth century undertook generally the whole Islamic world, more specifically Indian-Subcontinent, into a politically decisive moment. Consequential to a wide period of colonial reign, Muslims brought up a series of mounting struggles to respond to the political and cultural domination of the West. Cherishing the centuries of unmitigated history of Islamic supremacy and influence in the lives of the Muslims, Islam contributed a momentous role in Muslim response and retort to Western imperialism. This stimulated the advancement of Islamic modernism, and was an issue to instigate Muslim independence and nationalist movements. Fascinated with their Islamic legacy and tradition, Islamic reformers wanted to bring back Muslim pride and selfconfidence to restore Muslim society politically and communally. Their formation of Islamic reconstruction called for a fresh interpretation: a development of Islam that could bring about harmony between Islam and modernity, which restated the privileged circumstances and significance of Islamic ideology to politics, law, and society. Since, the Indian Muslims did not obtain enough potency of temperament to resist those forces, which inclined to fragment their communal being, the distinguished South Asian Muslim intellectual reformer Muhammad Iqbal had mentioned in the 1930s the correlation among consensus, democratization, and Ijtihad. Iqbal's vision of the powerful, life-affirming self would exert its influence among opinion-makers of South Asia. Abul A'la Maududi (1903-1979), founder of the Jamaat-e-Islami movement, was a working associate of Iqbal.... For Iqbal it was incomprehensible that a religion that passed authority to the powerless, can lay political authority to a privileged minority. Since, Iqbal was renowned as one of the main personage in modern Islam, and was not considered as a dogmatic nationalist or religious fundamentalist, he presented an exceedingly sound criticism of Western democracy. Iqbal believed that the desired harmonization in Western democracy and the progression of spirituality in Muslim society does not depend on the perseverance of formations of organizations. This constancy brought insignificant results. According to him: ... the ultimate fate of the people does not depend so much on organization as on the worth and power of individual men. For him it was a complicated situation to settle an open-minded and advance ethical temperament with a refined and positive political orderliness. In the ideal Muslim society, the political power has been assigned to the whole society and every individual who can put into effect these authorities consistent with their designated affiliates as a sanctified accountability, and with-in the restrictions set by God. The particular technicalities of election and political organizations can be described consistent with the essence of the times, and the altering needs of all societies, but the principle of election shall remain unquestionable. He founded democracy distasteful since "colossal oppression masquerades in the robes of democracy", and at best he considered it a mechanistic device in which only numbers are counted, not the worth of the individuals. Iqbal considered a religious foundation as the first principle for any society and proclaimed that "be it a monarchy or a democratic show, if faith is removed from politics what is left is mere tyranny". The phase of mechanically borrowing methods and ideas from Western competency has passed, and at present the required attempt was to set up genuinely Islamic democratic methods. However, this attempt was not innately opposed to Western democratic methods, but it included acknowledgment that there were considerable shortcomings with the Western approach of democracy. Humanity was in need of a spiritual interpretation of the universe, spiritual emancipation of the individual and basic principles of a universal import of directing an evolution of human society on a spiritual basis. Thus Iqbal believed that the major task of Muslim societal order is to conserve the piety of the person and to generate chances for his spiritual progress. So, Iqbal indeed had articulated in his writings that he detested the modern democratic system of counting heads in the debate of political issues; this aversion, though, is not in opposition to the fundamental tenet of democracy, which is specifically, egalitarianism of everyone before law, but in opposition to the system use for determining the desires of layman. Iqbal, for that reason, cannot be blamed as totally opposed to democracy in its fundamental nature. Iqbal was undoubtedly a democrat.... yet he bitterly denounced Western democratic systems. Now, the essence of his criticism is that Western democratic societies aim only at accomplishing materialistic ends... Iqbal rejected Western democratic systems because of their lack of ethical and spiritual concerns. It is not their democratic forms and process which are in error but their orientation and value systems. Iqbal respected the concept of classless and divine democracy that is a method which recognized the dormant capability of individuals, where men of working-class benefit from political attribute, and where the country does not owe a favor only to the affluent and influentially advantaged elite. It was a method that assisted the powerless and the deprived more than the affluent; as stated by the first caliph Abu Bakr when he undertook authority: "The weak among you is powerful for me until I obtain what is owing to him and the powerful among you is weak for me until I acquire from him what is owed from him." His hatred for democracy is due to the particular form which it has taken in the West and which, in Iqbal's eyes, is nothing less than the rule of a certain privileged class which knows no law except of its own making, intended to usurp power for the exploitation of the weaker members of society. He says in Javid Nama: "Woe to the constitution of the democracy of Europe! o The sound of that trumpet renders the dead still deader; o Those tricksters, treacherous as the revolving spheres, o Have played the nations by their own rules, and swept the board." Iqbal had dreamt of a Muslim State that would advocate the dignified morals of individual nobility, communal impartiality, and spiritual and material liberty. In fact Iqbal wanted to develop a high moral society so that every organization in it will be self righteous. In this manner it will be Islamically democratic. Western democracy, if imitated superficially, will not be beneficial for society as it is obvious in the current political circumstances of Pakistan. Iqbal's insight, regarding the political standard of Islam is democratic in essence. He considered no innate conflicts with Western democracy and the original principles of Islam. His writings evidently depict the democratic character behind Iqbal's political philosophy. Hence democracy was the fundamental essence of his political ideal. The republican form of government is not only thoroughly consistent with the spirit of Islam, but has also become a necessity in view of the new forces that are set free in the world of Islam. Islamic democracy could not be implemented without communal support; otherwise it would be a kind of tyranny, which is against the teachings of Islam, as it is indispensable for every impartial and egalitarian government to satisfy the needs of common man. Besides, for the implementation of Islamic morals or values, we have to bring intellectual progress to our general public, to educate them regarding the morals of Islam. Thus there would be substantial improvement in the sincere enthusiasm towards Islamic ethics. And at the same time the interpretation of Islamic basics should develop according to the needs of time. This would enhance Islamic influence in Muslims. Thus the God fearing society would be aroused. For Iqbal religion could not be separated from politics since religion alone could endow men with the moral fiber necessary for good governance. Iqbal, however, did not favor theocracy, a government run by the Ulama. As a matter of principle Iqbal was against the Ulama assuming state roles or the establishment of a council of Ulama because that would separate the functionaries of religion from laymen and for Iqbal there cannot be a juxtaposition of the spiritual and the temporal. Iqbal's ideal polity would be a society firmly anchored on a religious foundation and ruled by what may perhaps be described as an aristocracy of Islamic intellect. Moreover, Iqbal considered the belligerent warfare as one of the terrors of modern civilization. He was habituated to saying that the utmost disaster of Islam was when it turned into a kingdom. The abolition of the Caliphate and the subsequent growth of a republican spirit in the Muslim countries was a return to the original purity of Islam. According to him this development was the underlying principle of Islam, which was displaced by Arab imperialism, especially after the fourth Caliph. Iqbal's era was under the sway of two major philosophies important in twentieth century: Capitalism and Socialism. However, Iqbal beautifully treated both of them, and did not get influenced by them as many of his contemporaries. Using his Islamic perspective, Iqbal sought to assess capitalism and socialism, the two major ideologies dominating the twentieth century and vying for power in the Muslim world. His criticism of Western democracy followed from his belief that the Western capitalist system suppressed the individual and his growth and made true democracy an impossibility: The Democratic system of the West is the same old instrument whose chords contain no note other than the voice of the Kaiser, "The Demon of Despotism is dancing in his democratic robes, Yet you consider it to be the Nilam Pari of Liberty". And again in Persian Psalms we read: "Of the hireling‘s blood outpoured, Lustrous rubies makes the Lord, Tyrant squire to swell his wealth, Desolates the peasant‘s tilth." In Javid Nama, Iqbal ultimately finds the fundamental faults of capitalism and communism to be the same: "Both fail to recognize the Lord, deceive, Mankind. The one for revolution thirsts, The other for tribute: they‘re two millstones, That pulverizes the humankind." He condemns the gross materialism and godlessness of both systems: The soul of both is impatient and intolerant; both of them know not God and deceive mankind. One lives by production, the other by taxation and man is a glass caught between these two stones. Islam does not approve stern and inflexible domination of the individual for the benefit or welfare of public, nor does it allow the individual's absolute liberty to proceed in the path of his self-centeredness and consequently jeopardizing the living of powerless communal members. It imposes essential restrictions upon both the individual and society which must not intrude upon in any circumstances. This is anticipated as the outcome of spread of Divine Law and also brings into line the communities welfare. The law of God is absolutely supreme. Authority, except as an interpreter of the law, has no place in the social structure of Islam. Islam has a horror of personal authority. We regard it as inimical to the enfoldment of human individuality.... the absolute equality of all the members of the community. There is no aristocracy in Islam. "The noblest among you", says the Prophet, "are those who fear God most". There is no privileged class, no priesthood, no caste system... Now, this principle of the equality of all believers made early Musalmans the greatest political power in the world. Islam worked as a leveling force; it gave the individual a sense of his inward power; it elevated those who were socially low. The elevation of the down-trodden was the chief secret of the Muslim political power in India....... On the other hand, the current state of Muslims morale in India was in contrast to the desired prerequisite for acquiring the needed development. Thus Iqbal brought to light that: ...We are suffering from a double caste system –the religious caste system, sectarianism, and the social caste system, which we have either learned or inherited from the Hindus. This is one of the quiet ways in which conquered nations revenge themselves on their conquerors. Islam does not bifurcate the unity of man into an irreconcilable duality of spirit and matter. In Islam God and the universe, spirit and matter, Church and State, are organic to each other.

Pan-Islamism 

It is possible to discuss about an earlier Pan-Islamic illustration in Iqbal's political idea which had a place for caliphate. But, political proceedings in his era heralded for quite a few changes. This did not suggest an entire desertion of a Pan-Islamic principle. It was the objective of his guidance that all Muslim states ought to look inside to reinforce and reconstruct them, so that the Muslim nations will take part in a League of Nations-like association. Such a ‘League‘ would be ingrained in the shared principle of its members. This mutual ‘in agreement‘ would move rapidly in a single movement from their Islamic traditions with their general principles of equality, fraternity, and solidarity and their communal law—the shariah. Hence, Muslim nations possibly would shun disagreement or hostility so that it is probable to bring to an end to the drawbacks of nationalism with its propensity to the fragmentation of society into adversary ethnic groups. Thus he visualized an international Muslim nation, as he declared that Islam was neither ‘nationalism‘ nor ‘imperialism‘ but a ‘League of nations‘, which recognizes artificial boundaries and racial distinctions for facility of reference only, and not for restricting the social horizon of its members. Besides, he also considered that for the present time, each Muslim nation should focus on itself until all became sufficiently powerful to establish a living family of republics by reconciling their reciprocal enmities, through integrating the affiliation of Islam. The standardized spiritual culture in the Islamic world would make possible the political unanimity of Muslim nations. Iqbal hoped this integration could further lead us towards the outline of a perfect global nation, or develop into a League of Muslim Nations, or become a range of self-governing Muslim nations interwoven with each other through discourse, deals or agreements. Nationality with us is a pure idea; it has no geographical basis. But inasmuch as the average man demands a material centre of nationality, the Muslim looks for it in the holy town of Mecca, so that the basis of Muslim nationality combines the real and the ideal, the concrete and the abstract....The best form of Government for such a community would be democracy, the ideal of which is to let man develop all the possibilities of his nature by allowing him as much freedom as practicable. The Caliph of Islam is not an infallible being; like other Muslims he is subject to the same law; he is elected by the people and is deposed by them if he goes contrary to the law. Thus for him democracy did not only mean to imitate Western style of government, rather a just kind of government by which humanity and kindness prevails and progresses. For that reason he extensively pointed out towards a national league of Muslim states that could unite and give the world, what was needed. As Quran states:  While Iqbal did express misgivings about Western democracy and its suitability for Muslims, or for Muslims, or for multi-cultural societies in general, he argued that the republican form of government was not only thoroughly consistent with the spirit of Islam. The road to the restoration of the khalifa, and with it the unity of the umma must come at the end of a quest for national independence and identity, and take the form of a ‘league of nations‘, a commonwealth of autonomous national entities. Like his other ideas, his political supposition is distinguished by the deliberate rotating of history to find those values and ideals which could offer an example for the contemporary and the future. Similar to the majority of Muslim revivalists, Iqbal credited the deterioration of Islam to the Muslim's moving away from Islamic values. The result of which were the worsening conditions. The life force of the Indian Muhammadan, however, has become woefully enfeebled. The decay of the religious spirit, combined with other causes of a political nature over which he had no control, has developed in him a habit of self-dwarfing, a sense of dependence and, above all, that laziness of spirit, which an enervated people call by the dignified name of ‘contentment‘ in order to conceal their own enfeeblement. Iqbal's immense input was his regeneration of the conscious energetic spirit of Islam. He symbolized to society those Islamic principles that could create fresh life for the Islamic political entity. He tried to revise primary values and propagated through his poetry that could possibly stir his fellow Muslims to the instinct which could have triggered their intellects with a craving to discover means of understanding such principles. At the beginning of the 20th century when Iqbal illustrated his poetic skills, he created some rousing poems that throbbed with the lasting emotions of nationalism. However, subsequent to 1908, his considerations underwent harrowing changes. His initial eagerness for Indian nationalism diminished and he appeared as one of the greatest Pan-Islamist of this century. Slowly his ideas took a new shape. During his stay in Europe, He had come into closer contact with the German vitalist philosophy, and there is no doubt that this Weltanschauung appealed very much to him, and helped him to discover a new approach to his own religion and culture, in rediscovering the original dynamism of Islam. He had begun as a patriot in the Western sense; hence his anthem: Our India is the best of all countries in the world. But then he reverted to the Islamic notion of patriotism, and corrected himself in another famous anthem: China and Arabia are ours, India is ours,Muslim we are, the whole world is ours ... O water of the river Ganges, thou rememberst the dayWhen our torrent flooded thy valleys...In a speech in Aligarh Oriental College in 1910:  Islam, as a social and political Ideal‘, he reminded the audience of the past glorious development of the Islamic peoples, since he understood that the Indian Muslim has long since ceased to exploit the depths of his inner life. Several of his outstanding poems are brilliant with the faultless descriptions of his poetic brilliance and he mourned over the vanishing of Muslim universalism. Shikwa and Jawab-e-Shikwa, Shama aur Shair (The Poet and the Candle), Khizr-I Rah (The Guide) and Talu-e Islam (The Rise of Islam) explain Islam's historical magnificence and its current agony and dissatisfaction with a splendor of expressions and thoughts which is only one of its kind in the history of Urdu literature. Jawab-I Shikwa, which was read at a community gathering at Lahore in 1913, states compassion and high regard for the Turks, which combatted the enemy in the Balkan wars. The whole poem is a work of art of expressiveness and demonstrates vast profundity of emotions, and it depicts the reasons why Muslims of the world require to be unified. In a passage of the poem, he fervently condemned the Muslims, and considered them accountable for their individual and collective collapse. Ever since the conversion of Mohammad Iqbal, sometime during his stay in Europe, from territorial nationalism to Islam, he considered certain values of ethical orientation as crucial both to the survival and development of mankind, values which, in his view, constituted the essence of Islam. In fact, Iqbal professed that God, who gave them honor in the history, is the same. His blessings were the same, but it was Muslims who have distorted, and have dissociated themselves from the character which permitted them to be the beneficiaries of God's everlasting blessings. Men by and large acquired what they be worthy of. A hunter ultimately finds what he targets. The Muslims in history were genuine in their loyalty to Islam as such their rewards were immense. The approach of the contemporary Muslims are un-Islamic since they have shattered the universality of millat, and have separated this commonwealth of believers into regional bodies founded on race and region. The Muslims of the world have one Quran, one Faith, one Belief, one Kaaba, and this is the entire basis for them to be cohesive as one nation. Though, it seems that since Iqbal was confronted by the political environment that was complemented with profound tendency to be easily swayed by emotions, and even if Iqbal as a philosopher might have ascended over it, Iqbal as a poet might not. When Iqbal pointed to certain events in past Islamic history, he did so not because he wanted to go back to the past but because they yielded some sort of inspiration. His values were vertically ‘up’, not horizontally in the past. To bring these values into play in the arena of the spatio-temporal world was the task of a Muslim- his “man of faith” (mard-i-mumin) or “perfect man” (insane kamil), who could comprise the Muslim Community if only it could recover solidarity and its true being culture. It was for this realization of this ideal that Iqbal dreamed of Muslim autonomy to be carried out in the Muslim majority areas of the Indian sub-continent. And it was for this reason that he explicitly rejected Indian territorialism as the basis for nationhood since nationhood, for him, was squarely based on ideology. Iqbal did not talk merely of two nations in India but of “nations”—apparently more than two—in his correspondence with Jinnah. Yet, since he did not explicitly speak of a multiplicity of sovereign states in India (perhaps because he did not think it realistic under the then conditions in the sub-continent). It seems he was in favor of diverse states (according to the diversity of nation which existed) within India, and also wanted to arouse the nationalistic spirits in Indian Muslims. What's more, here again Iqbal became an idealist when he overlooks the existing circumstances and relationships between Hindus and Muslims. In regard to the defense of the subcontinent, he stated: "I am sure that the scheme of a neutral Indian army based on federated India, will intensify Moslem patriotic feeling, and finally set at rest the suspicion, if any of the Indian Moslems joining Moslems from beyond the frontier in the event of an invasion…. Thus possessing full opportunity of development within the body politic of India, the north-western Moslems will prove the best defenders of bayonets. These statements indicate that the north-western Moslem state that he envisioned was to be part of an Indian Confederation. He failed to answer the question of how this plan could work without creating friction between Hindus and Moslems. Nevertheless, Iqbal ended up as a romantic utopian when it comes to the concept of Muslim nationalism and ideas according to Hussain Ahmed Madani with whom Iqbal had a series of conflicts. Although he was a traditional Alim, for a Muslim nationalist, he had sound and bona-fide arguments. Iqbal gives emotional reasoning and took the isolated words of Quam, Ummat and Millat from Quran and had his own insignificant explanations for them. In a statement the Madani said, "Nations are made by territory." Although Iqbal was seriously ill at the time, however, he decided to give a detailed refutation to this statement. He wrote some very forceful, verses castigating Madanis contentions and pointed out that to say that nationalism is not contrary to Islam is highly sacrilegious, and the gravity of this in increases manifold when it is committed from the pulpit of a mosque. He charged Madani of being completely ignorant of the mission of the Holy Prophet. These sentiments he expressed in a poem in Gift from Hijaz, and told the Madani that he should search for light in the life of Holy Prophet and if he could not do that, he was ignorance personified. On the other hand, Madani advocated that Islam includes the values that lie behind the morality of principle, feasible, and ethical issues. It was the way not just for personal spiritual revolution, but also for the supervision of the community in its domestic as well as political facets. It gave light on all provisions of life, and it provided every kind of directives. At present, we ought to study that Islam comprises values controlling personal and mutual collective life. Other regional similarities nationalism was shared with nonMuslims as well. Moreover, in refuting Iqbal's accusations he stated that: "Millat means sharia or deen or tariqa (law or faith or system) weather it is true or false and Qaum means a group of men or men and women, weather pious or impious or different, with a condition that they have something in common within themselves.…the prophets illustrated in the Quran while addressing to their people belonged to the same qawm as did their infidel addressees. "And O my people! How is it that I call you to salvation while you call me to the Fire! (40:41) and many more verses like 40:29, 30 and 39, 36:20-21 and 26-28." Iqbal advocated that nationhood is death of Islam. Muslims comprise an ummah, and an ummah cannot be restricted to any territorial boundary. According to Iqbal, notion like sovereignty of the state, and sanctimonious character of the boundaries drawn around it are completely alien to Islamic faith. The collective existence of the Islamic community is not based on family ties, and ethnic connections. The unity among Muslims is rooted in religion. If Muslims want to solidify their ranks, their only option is to strengthen the bonds of religion. If they fail to abide by religion, the millat would be fragmented, and once this happens that would be its swan song. On the contrary, Madani upheld that a nation is a geographical idea while ummah is a religious or sacred notion. Muslims are an ummah and are, in that logic, an international society. However, Madani stated, one must not be confused between the idea of nation and the idea of ummah. The previous is a political group while the later is a religious group. Therefore, it is appealing to observe that Madani who was also the president of the Jamiat Ulema-e-Hind, declined to uphold the two nation theory. He in his place assisted the Composite nationhood and had written a book called Composite Nationalism and Islam. It is significant to observe that Madani also mentioned, the covenant which the Prophet (PBUH) drafted with people of Madina belonging to assorted religions and tribes (it is called the Mithaq-I-Madinah). Madani called it the forerunner of the current idea of nation. The Prophet drafted the covenant among diverse religions (Jews, Muslims and pagans) and different tribes (Jewish, Muslim and Pagan) and explained this compound society as ummah wahidah i.e. one community. Consequently, the Prophet (PBUH) went beyond the limitations of religion to comprise a geographical community. The situation in Madina was pluralistic there was no single community.... So, the Holy Prophet drew up this covenant with leaders of different religions... And it has very close parallel to the Indian situation..... when the Holy Prophet could accept plurality and give full freedom to the followers of all religions including tribal religion where there was no question of book...., they were also given freedom to practice their religion. Misaqe Madina can become our guide if we are prepared to reread the text. And there even the concept of Umma was very different. It was not Muslim community but it was Madinese community, all were included Jews were included; tribals were included and Muslims were included. The concept of Umma in Madina was very different from its later meaning which confined only to Muslim later on. But as far as the Holy Prophet was concerned, he did not confine it to the Muslims alone. This provided evidence to set down the establishment of the foremost political society in Madina, in which diverse ethnic groups, religions, and other cliques were equivalent associates in every element, including been permitted liberty to adhere to their own religion. It can be noticed that the Prophet set down an agreement ordaining reciprocally settled conditions more willingly than founding theological territory. All the religious and tribal groups were allowed to retain full autonomy
in respect of their customs and traditions. In the event of any dispute the case had to be settled in keeping with these customs and traditions. ... The foundational principles of this document are autonomy to various constituent groups, freedom of professing and practicing ones religion, customs and traditions and equal rights in matters common to all the constituents. Secondly, the document clearly emphasizes democratic form of governance, which should be based on consensus and agreement and not on coercion and compulsion. Here it would also be important to note that the Prophet, in matters of political governance, has refrained from invoking theological authority. While it is a fact that Muslim universalism, which has at all times been customary as an essential part of the religious dogma, has hardly ever been carried out in the essence like Iqbal believed. Muslims throughout the world do not constitute a political community. It was possible only in early period of caliphate—during what is called the period of Rashidun Caliphate when Muslims could move from one part of the Caliphate to another part. There were no restrictions. But when many Muslim rulers emerged on the scene restrictions began to appear. And now in the modern nation-states no Muslim can go and settle in any other Muslim territory unless permitted to do so according to the rules..... Even Saudi Arabia, which claims that the Quran is its constitution, does not allow Muslims from other parts of world to settle in its nationally defined territory. Even for the purpose of Haj one has to obtain visa.... Thus in modern times the concept of ummah can only be spiritual and religious and not political. Since the establishment of caliphate provided the Muslim world only a representative unity, the Muslim realm was always divided into self-governing autonomous states. Moreover, even now we observe both nationalism and secularism in numerous Muslim states. Turkey, for example, is equally secular and a nationalistic country. Same is the case for Malaysia. Even Indonesia, the largest Muslim country in the world at moment, is a secular country. And these are only the few Muslim countries who have accomplished progress. No specific Muslim country is Iqbal's ideal: it is rather the ideal realm of Islam or the ideal of existence emanating from the spirit of Islam with which Iqbal's thought is imbued. In idolizing Islam, Iqbal was often carried away and contrasts it with Christianity—not the ideal world of Christianity but the actual one as Iqbal saw it exist in Europe. ....His views on Muslims as a nation were not fully understood at the time since he rejected territorial nationalism yet demanded a separate territorial homeland for Muslims. Yet although Iqbal is concerned with polity and society and propounds ideal solutions, he did not concern himself with details: he offered no specific scheme pertaining to the socioeconomic structure and the political system he would like established. Maulana Madani persuasively reasoned in the support of multiple nationalisms by substantially citing from the Quran. The Maulana's chief line of reasoning was that Qaumiyat was a territorial idea, and was not a religious one. It is millat which has religious implication. Moreover, Maulana Madani contended through assorted historical paradigms to explain that collective nationality is not hostile to the teachings of Islam. He stated that when an individual can execute numerous characters simultaneously as a father, a son, a son-in-law, a teacher, a student, a ruler, then why he is not capable of uniting dissimilar identities and purposes as a resident of a state, a Muslim, a speaker of a particular language, and the rest? In short, the Muslims of India can live as Indian nationals with other nonMuslim populations and pursue their personal religion, individual law, converse their language and so on. The idea that Islam is an inflexible religion is further than my understanding. To the point that I can comprehend its laws, it[Islam] can live collectively with non-Muslims in one country; it can be peaceful with them; it can make agreement with them, and in business-related dealings, alliance, occupancy, the exchange of gifts, loans, trusts, etc. He [Muslim] can intermingle with them, partake in affairs of happiness and sorrow, and eat with them...A Muslim can go in and settle in the nonbeliever's lands of non-belief and the ‘abodes of war.’ ...There are innumerable laws and principles governing social structure in Islam that discloses its thoughtfulness for and open-mindedness for others and that are not found in other religions... This is the meaning of [Islam's] flexibility (lachack). But this flexibility does not mean subjection, or an eagerness to make untrue and prohibited deeds matters of satisfactory practice. Most of all it inspired hatred among the Indian Muslims for their Hindu compatriots, who could be in fact the object of proselytizing. Hence, this approach was another critical hindrance in the propagation of Islam. He further proposed that other varied measures might be taken on to defend Muslim's Political rights, and they could remain liberated to create interactions with other sections of the Islamic world, be it Afghanistan, Iran, Iraq, Central Asia, Africa, Europe or America. Madani wrote all this as contradictory to the two- nation theory. Indeed, as stated by him the actual essence of the Quran was to support congruent coexistence in a multi-cultural, multi-racial and multi-religious world. The Quran states:  Indian Muslims were fellow-nationals with other communities and groups in India, though separate from them in religion. At present, he said, nations are made by homelands, as for instance England, where members of different faiths make up one nation. Diversities of religion make no difference to the formation of a qawm, because they are essential to a millat. However, at the same time as a millat, the Muslims of India were not a divided individual, for they were the element of the worldwide society of Muslims, and it was improper for one part of this worldwide society to identify itself in defensive terms to the segregation of Muslims and aims to depart. Indeed, Madani dynamically argues and gives his factual rationales in the opposition of Muslim League's manifestoes. The Jamiyyat al Ulama-i-Hind regarded the Muslim league's ‘hostage‘ theory that is the minority on both sides of the border, not only as political none sense but also as contrary to the Muslim Holy Law. Furthermore, the hatred of Muslims which, in the nineteen-forties was already being generated by the demand for partition, together with the stirring up of feelings of contempt and fear towards Hindus, would render the peaceful spread of Islam by the Ulama impossible. Madani believed that the large increase in the Muslim population of India since the end of Muslim rule – he put it at 400 per cent – was attributable to this peaceful missionary activity. Madani asserted that as the Muslims of India were a separate religious entity between the religious communities that existed in the subcontinent, they were component of the same ‘nation‘ (qaum) as their Hindu fellow citizens. A nation was not comprised by ties of faith; such ties were the origin of a milla, which represents a religion, a religious law, and a faith-based path and the community of those who pursue it. Therefore, it is clear that Iqbal was fundamentally a poet and as far as his ideas for nationalism are concerned, they were based on sentiments and were not rationally grounded. With this debate between Madani and Iqbal, the deficiencies of two-nation theory and its inconsistency with Islam were lucidly evident. Moreover, it is obvious that Madani has a more logical and valid arguments than Iqbal's sentimental poetic ideology. So, Islam does not in any way encourage political unity on the basis of religion and it has never existed in entire Islamic history. Political unity broke immediately after the death of the Holy Prophet. So there is no question that 1400 years after his death, there will be political unity. There was political unity only in his lifetime. But after his death, Muslims differs from each other politically and different political power centers came into existence. So, modern nationalism which is territorial in concept does not conflict with the basic teachings of Islam as long as we separate religious unity from political unity. Iqbal's idea of a Muslim state was, as a matter of fact, to create a place for Muslims to experiment and revitalize the deadwood that Islam had become into throughout the centuries, and to rediscover its active and swaying qualities. However, in 1930 it was again Iqbal who realistically wanted mutual harmony and co-operation within Indian nationalism. It seemed that his rational attitude at times guided him, but his overall poetic idealist nature overwhelmed his rationality. The unity of an Indian nation, therefore, must be sought, not in the negation but in the mutual harmony and co-operation of the many..... And it is on the discovery of Indian unity in this direction that the fate of India as well as Asia really depends. India is Asia in miniature....If an effective principle of cooperation is discovered in India, it will bring peace and mutual good will to this ancient land which has suffered so long, more because of her situation in historic space than because of any inherent incapacity of her people. And it will at the same time solve the entire political problem of Asia. It is, however, painful to observe that our attempts to discover such a principle of internal harmony have so far failed. Why have they failed? Perhaps we suspect each other's intentions and inwardly aim at dominating each other. Perhaps in the higher interests of mutual co-operation we cannot afford to part with the monopolies which circumstances have placed in our hands and conceal our egoism under the cloak of nationalism, outwardly as narrow minded as a caste or a tribe. Perhaps, we are unwilling to recognize that each group has a right to free development according to its own cultural traditions. But whatever may be the causes of our failure, I still feel hopeful. Events seem to be tending in the direction of some sort of internal harmony. And as far as I have been able to read the Muslim mind, I have no hesitation in declaring that if the principle that the Indian Muslim is entitled to full and free development on the lines of his own culture and tradition in his own Indian home-lands is recognized as the basis of a permanent communal settlement, he will be ready to stake his all for the freedom of India.... It is quite obvious that Iqbal had a deep desire of Indian nationalism for Indian Muslims. How could he be charged for the immense hatred among Muslims and Hindus for forever, or the inclination for the bloody division of India? All he wanted the Muslims to be united for their own benefit. India is a continent of human groups belonging to different races, speaking different languages and professing different religions. Their behavior is not at all determined by a common race-consciousness. Even the Hindus do not form a homogenous group. The principle of European democracy cannot be applied to India without recognizing the fact of communal groups. The Muslim demand for the creation of a Muslim India within India is, therefore, perfectly justified. I would like to see the Punjab, North-West Frontier Province, Sind and Baluchistan amalgamated in to a single State. Self-government within the British Empire or without the British Empire, the formation of a consolidated North-West Indian Muslim State appears to me to be the final destiny of the Muslims, at least of North-West India. Therefore, in his speech, he mentioned the continuance of segregate electorates and the formation of a centralized constitution to fulfill Muslim wants. Iqbal was in support of the formation of different states within India according to their similarity of race, religion and culture. Hence, he clearly said ―Muslim India within India, instead of dividing India. Indeed, a federation, not an independent Muslim state. On account of his historic Allahabad speech, Iqbal was regarded as the architect of the state of Pakistan, a term formulated three years afterwards. This understanding was only in some measure genuine. He was quiet for the destiny of the Muslims of East Bengal, who were actually more numerous than the north-western Muslims. Whether this was a failure to notice an intentional omission, it was not evident. Perhaps Iqbal might have had the insight that Bengalis were from the beginning more advanced and enlightened than the rest of the Indian Muslims. Moreover, they were entirely different in their language and culture from the other Indian Muslims. This perception proved accurate in 1971, when Bangladesh came into being. Moreover, Iqbal is also known responsible for generating skeptic thinking, through his poetry towards everything which comes from West. He thinks that the rise of nationalism in the Muslim world is a conspiracy planned by the Western powers. The purpose of the whole design is to weaken Islam as a dynamic force in the political and social life of mankind. One of the grave outcomes of this stress on the political aspect of Muslim deterioration is that it perceived only unfairness, plots, and sufferings, but not the weakness in the Muslim psyche which did not stand up to the demands of modernity. The Quranic verse,  in which God assures that ‘adversity‘ is escorted by ‘ease‘, or ‘release‘, have been misconstrued by a number of interpreters of Quranic texts to indicate that release will arrive subsequent to adversity. However, the verse under consideration in fact converses of ease together with adversity, which indicates that unfavorable situations could themselves have fresh opportunities. Therefore, Muslims are suffering the adverse state of affairs consequent upon colonial rule and Western ascendancy. Muslims have not availed the opportunities brought by adversity. For example, in existing times, the emphasis rests on assurance of freedom of thought and protections from religious persecution, which together with contemporary measures of communication, have exposed the latest possibilities for the propagation of Islam. The political activists and Ulama have although acquired the benefits of modern technologies but live on as though in denial of the challenges of the modern era. In a world that is indebted to freedom of faith and expression, the concept of departing from the planned course of blind following has been constantly objectionable to the Ulama, since this carries the potent thought that it could be legitimate to analytically study the intellectual works of their forebears.

Propagation of Islam 
Iqbal strongly believed that Islam is the religion of peace and its spread was occurred through peaceful measures. Politically, the solidarity of Islam would break up if Muslim nations were to be at war with each other, and religiously this solidarity would vanish if Muslims rise against the main values of Islam. He regarded all the wars of the Prophet as defensive actions. Iqbal affirmed: It has been said that Islam is a religion which implies a state of war. Now, there can be no denying that war is an expression of the energy of a nation; a nation which cannot fight cannot hold its own in the strain and stress of selective competition, which constitutes an indispensable condition of all human progress: Defensive war is certainly permitted by the Quran; but the doctrine of aggressive war against unbelievers is wholly unauthorized by the Holy book of Islam. Here are the words of the Quran:―Summon them to the way of thy Lord with wisdom and kindly warning; dispute them in the kindest manner. Say to those who have been given the book and to the ignorant: “Do you accept Islam‘? Then, if they accept Islam they are guided aright: but if they turn away then thy duty is only preaching; and God's eye is on His servants.” He further gave examples from Prophet's life in confirmation of his
argument. ...All the wars undertaken during the life-time of the Prophet were defensive. His war against the Roman Empire in 628A.D. began by a fatal breach of international law on the part of the Government at Constantinople who killed the innocent Arab envoy sent to their court. Even in defensive wars he forbids wanton cruelty to the vanquished...... Moreover, Iqbal justly maintained that Islamic history demonstrated that the growth of Islam is under no circumstances linked to the victories of its wars..... The history of Islam tells us that the expansion of Islam as a religion is in no way related to the political power of its followers. The greatest spiritual conquests of Islam were made during the days of our political decrepitude. When the rude barbarians of Mangolia drowned in blood the civilization of Baghdad in 1258 A.D., when the Muslim power fell in Spain and the followers of Islam were mercilessly killed or driven out of Cordova by Ferdinand in 1236, Islam had just secured a footing in Sumatra and was about to work the peaceful conversion of the Malay Archipelago. Iqbal further argued through Thomas Walker Arnold's point that Islam attained its luminous conquests when the political degradation arouse in Islamic history. Two of them, according to Arnold, were the Seljuk Turks in eleventh and the Mongols in thirteenth century: .....in each case the conquerors have accepted the religion of the conquered. “We undoubtedly find, says the same learned scholar elsewhere, ―that Islam gained its greatest and most lasting missionary triumphs in times and places in which its political power has been weakest, as in South India and Eastern Bengal. Thus, political pre-eminence is not necessary for the propagation and progression of Islam.

Role in politics 
By 1935, Iqbal was convinced that the All-India Muslim League was the only political party among the Muslims, which could galvanize the national potential to safeguard the interests of the Muslim masses. At its Bombay Session in 1936, the All-India Muslim League authorized Jinnah to organize a Central Parliamentary Board to work for the forthcoming elections under the Government of India Act 1935. Jinnah approached Fazl-i-Hussain to help him in forming the Punjab Parliamentary Board on behalf of the Muslim League, but the latter refused to co-operate in this matter. Jinnah then turned to Iqbal, who readily agreed to give every possible help in the formation of the Punjab Parliamentary Board. The Punjab Muslim League under the leadership of Iqbal made every possible effort to mobilize men and material for the coming election. Towards the close of Iqbal's life, the picture of Muslim politics was encouraging. He worked ceaselessly, with supreme honesty and sincerity, to bring unity of purpose and ideals among the Muslims. In 1937, he fell seriously ill and died in April 1938, but the later political currents in the sub-continent showed that his endeavors were not wasted. Leadership in Iqbal's ideal state would arise as a result of an effort to replicate the qualities of the Prophet, whose leadership in all spheres of community life provides an eternal guide to the Muslims. Magnanimity, prudence, piety, courage to fight for righteous cause, forgiveness in a moment of triumph, fear of God and love of people are some of the characteristics which form the most suitable equipment for a Muslim leader. Loyalty to the Sharia and services to the people are the criteria to judge the competence of a leader. According to Iqbal leadership is not monopolistic in nature. Monopoly of power by an individual or a group in contrary to the Canon Law.

Indian Sub-Continent's Politics (1905-1926)
The evolution of Iqbal's thoughts on nationalism with particular reference to the Indo-Pakistan subcontinent, has been noticed earlier in detail. To begin with, he was a fervent nationalist, but even at the height of his nationalistic fervor, he was a Muslim first and a nationalist afterwards. His primary concern was the fate of the Muslim community in India. It was their interest, prestige and welfare which constantly kept his mind occupied. Both as an observer and a participant in practical politics, he kept the interests of his people in the forefront. Although, it was during his later years that Iqbal became involved with practical politics, even early in his life he did not hesitate to participate in movements which were meant to safeguard the political rights of the Muslim community. After his return from England, Iqbal was mostly busy with his professional affairs, but he was fully aware of the political climate around him. An organization by the name of Muslim League was in existence in Punjab, even before the creation of the All-India Muslim League in 1906. Later the Punjab Muslim League was affiliated with the All-India Muslim League. Mian Shah Din, who later on became the Chief Judge of the Punjab Chief Court, was the President of the Provincial Muslim League and Mian Muhammad Shafi (later Sir Mohammad Shah) acted as the Secretary of this body. During this period, Iqbal was closely associated with the work of this organization, and used to participate in its deliberations. It is to be kept in mind that from 1910 to 1923 Iqbal's participation in politics was not active. His primary concentration was on poetic and philosophic works. He wrote stirring poetry which created political and religious awakening among the Muslims. It does not mean that Iqbal was a religious fanatic. His primary objective was to secure peace and freedom for all communities. This is meant to show that in spite of his specific views on Indian politics, Iqbal was ever desirous of promoting friendship and understanding among the various political parties. It is meant to answer those critics who, in view of Iqbal's advocacy of a separate Islamic state, accuse him of religious fanaticism.

Nehru Report and Simon Commission
Although in the beginning Iqbal desired non-participation in the party politics of the country, from 1926 onwards he swiftly developed a close association with various Muslim political parties in which he held important offices. The political movements were extremely animated and Iqbal was conscious of the fact that contemporary political activity was crucial for the future political status of all communities. Nehru Report was the issue of the day. Muslim leaders held different opinions regarding this report. They were divided into three groups. The first group led by Maulana Azad and Mukhtar Ahmed Ansari advocated the acceptance of the report in totality. The second group headed by Muhammad Ali Jinnah and the Raja of Mahmudabad and the third group consisted of Sir Mohammad Shafi and his followers who wanted to reject the Nehru Report completely. Iqbal belonged to the third group. It was on the question of the Nehru Report that the dissenting group of the Muslim League left the organization and under the leadership of Sir Mohammad Shah formed a parallel League called the “Shah League”. In regard to the Nehru Report Iqbal entirely sided with Sir Mohammad Shah. He became the Secretary of the Shafi League. While the Congress and the Muslim League were wrangling about the Nehru Report, the British Government sent the Simon Commission to make an on-the-spot enquiry about the future constitutional advancement of the country. The Simon Commission was boycotted both by the Congress and the Muslim League. But the Shah wing of the Muslim League had decided to co-operate with the Simon Commission. In order to prepare the draft of the representation, the Shah League had constituted a committee and Iqbal was one of its members. While the committee was busy drafting the representation, Iqbal was suddenly taken ill and went to Delhi for treatment. The Committee prepared the draft in his absence, and on return, Iqbal found that some vital points had been omitted from the final draft.  Because of this, he was most annoyed and resigned from the secretary ship of the Shah League. The effect of this resignation was that the representation was reshaped in the light of Iqbal's suggestions. As a matter of principle Iqbal believed that in politics, debates and discussions were better than sticks and brickbats. In his opinion, the Muslims were not to hesitate to explain their position before the commission, and along with Sir Mohammad Shah, he played a significant role in putting before the commission the Muslim point of view. He also wrote a small poem in praise of the Simon Commission, in which he pointed out that the work of the Commission might open new vistas of hope and happiness. The Muslim leadership had not been divided so badly as during the-late twenties of this century. The Muslim League Jinnah wing which had decided to co-operate with the Congress and accepted the Nehru Report was thoroughly disappointed when, at the final meeting of the All-Parties Conference, its three minor amendments were rejected. It was at this juncture that the Muslim Conference came into existence with which Iqbal associated very closely.

Muslim Conference
The Muslim Conference emerged from a reaction which was felt among certain Muslim leaders against the conciliatory attitude of the AIML towards the Nehru Report. The moving spirit behind it was Fazl-i-Hussain, who was, at that time at the peak of his political career. Mohammad Shah also worked effectively behind the scene in its deliberations. These leaders had support from all those elements of Muslim population who thought that the Nehru Report should be rejected in totality by the Muslims. On the 28th August, 1928, the Second Session of the All-Parties Conference was convened under the Chairmanship of Mukhtar Ahmed Ansari. It was in this meeting that the Nehru Report was given its final shape. Mohammad Ali Jauhar and Jinnah had gone abroad, Shaukat Ali was present, but his protestations were completely ignored. Iqbal's association with the Muslim Conference was close and long. At first, he was the member of its Executive Council, and after that he presided at its annual session held at Lahore on the let March 1932. In his Presidential Address, he explained many complex issues of Indian politics with perspicacity and eloquence. He again voiced his apprehensions about the political philosophy of the Hindu community, which was patently western in origin and substance and thus, in his opinion, entirely unsuited to the conditions prevailing in the country. There was a climate of confusion. A reconciliation and synthesis of the two attitudes was an urgent need. Not only did Iqbal provide the keystone on which the ideological arch of Pakistan hinges, the one side of which consists of ulemas and the other of completely westernized people with a secular outlook, but he was also in favor of a new culture. As a provincial legislator, he also kept a keen eye on the interests of his own community. He was conscious of the fact that the Muslims were not getting their due share in the administrative and educational life of the country. The Hindus had established many educational institutions and most of the educational funds were consumed by them. He often brought this disparity to the notice of the government. In practical politics Iqbal's conduct was equally inspired by this spirit. He had an advantage over the professional politicians because he could bring forth the cool reflection of a philosopher to bear upon the complexities of public life.

Round Table Conferences
The most significant political events of the early thirties were the three Round Table Conferences, convened by the British Government in London to resolve some of the basic political and constitutional problems. In 1927, The Central Assembly in Delhi had passed a resolution suggesting that a Round Table Conference be convened in which representatives of the British Government and Indian people could participate in a face to face discussion and iron out the differences about the future constitution of India. The British Government at that time completely ignored this resolution. The Labor Party in England had always been favorably disposed towards the freedom movement of India. It came to power in 1929 and wanted to show some gesture of sympathy to the Indian aspirations. So, it decided to convene a Round Table Conference in London, where British and Indian representatives could meet to find solutions to the main problems. The Viceroy had mentioned that the Indian representatives of various communities would be nominated by the Government, but maximum efforts would be made to provide representation to all major political parties. The Indian National Congress resented the Viceroy's suggestion and decided to boycott the conference. The Government, however, went ahead with its programme. At the Conference, the Muslim leaders emphasized their demands about the future constitution of India, they also referred to the type of relationship that would be maintained between Great Britain and India, and they also mentioned the gravity of the situation in the light of fast deteriorating communal conditions. At the primary session of the Round Table Conference, which began in London on November 12, 1930. Iqbal participated in the second and the third sessions of the Conference. The representation was through Government nomination. Gandhi strove hard for the nomination of Mukhtar Ahmad Ansari but failed to achieve this object. Fazl-i-Hussain again played a decisive role in the selection of the Muslim delegation. All the four new members were from the Muslim Conference, so that there was no danger to the unity of the Muslim view-point. The Agha Khan led the delegation. Iqbal was among the four new members. The Conference had two committees, the one on ‘Federalism’ and the other on ‘Minorities’. Iqbal was selected as a member of the ‘Minorities Committee’. In the Committee-meetings, he explained to Gandhi all the possible implications of the minority question and worked tirelessly to evolve some kind of compromise with the majority community but all efforts ended in failure. After negotiating for a week behind the scene with minorities, Gandhi reported failure and suggested that the communal problem should be referred to the judicial tribunal after the constitution had been drafted. All the minorities jointly protested against this move, saying that the Hindus by indefinitely postponing the question of minorities, wanted to grab power themselves. Seeing that the various communities had failed, to find a solution to the ‘minority problem’ in August, 1932, the-Prime Minister of England announced his famous “Communal Award”. It did not give the Muslims all that they had demanded, for instance they were given majority seats in Punjab but not in Bengal, but the “Award” did maintain that the communal electorates should continue. On 24 August 1932, Iqbal issued a comprehensive statement on the Communal Award. He made many statement and made critical investigation of all aspects of the Award from the Muslim point of view, and through statistics and common sense, he tried to prove that the Muslims of the sub-continent were in no way gainers in this decision of the Government. But at the same time he felt that the Award, though inadequate from the point of view of the Muslims, was much better than the claims of the Congress, which was bent upon wiping out the very existence of the Muslim community as a separate political entity. The Congress working committee, in its resolution, neither accepted nor rejected the Award. On 19 June 1934, Iqbal issued a statement, condemning the Congress for such a nebulous stand on such a vital issue, and at the same time he advised the Muslims to hold fast to the Award with all its imperfections. The Third Session of the Round Table Conference was convened in November, 1932. Iqbal was again nominated by the Government as a member of the Muslim delegation. He was nominated as a member of the Educational Committee of the Anglo-Indian community in the Conference, but it appears that he did not attend any meeting of this committee in most of the meetings of the conference his role was more or less of an observer. This time Iqbal took an opportunity to acquaint the political circles of Britain with his scheme, which he had formulated in the Allahabad Address. The preceding discussion clarifies Iqbal's point of view on the communal problem to a considerable extent. He detested the establishment of a secular democracy of the western pattern, because it would reduce the Muslim community to a position of permanent minority, where its survival would depend upon the sweet will of the majority community. He opposed territorial nationalism because it would mean the disappearance of the Muslims as a historical and cultural entity in the land they had ruled with such distinction, for several centuries. Moreover, it would damage the religious and political ideology of the Muslims, which was their distinguishing feature. He wanted an honorable solution of the problem, which could assure the Muslims a respectable status in the political and constitutional system of the subcontinent, wherein they could live in the light of their religious and cultural requirements. The need for a separate Muslim State was rooted in the political speculations of Iqbal, which he conveyed in his writings, all his life. He was dedicated to the cause of the Sharia and believed that Islam could play a vital role in the world of today. The Islamic social system, in his opinion, had some very effective principles which could guarantee peace and order for humanity. The Islamic socio-economic system provided enough scope to remove poverty of the Indian Muslims, and the laws of Islam still had enough potency to control the unrighteous and anti-social acts of man. The new state that he visualized would be a sort of pioneer project to demonstrate the basic utility of the Islamic ideology, and would afford an opportunity for the Muslims to develop through Ijtihad, an Islamic system which would be in consonance with the needs of modern times.

See also 
 Index of Muhammad Iqbal–related articles

References

Further reading

External links 
 

Muhammad Iqbal
Religion and politics
Political positions of politicians
Political positions of Indian politicians
Political views by person